Mahapitiyage Velin Peter Peiris, OBE, LRCP, FRCS, (28 July 1898 - 26 April 1988) was a Ceylonese orthopaedic surgeon and politician.

Peiris received his education at St. John's College Panadura and St Joseph's College, Colombo, before entering Ceylon Medical College qualifying in 1926. After graduation and junior hospital posts he was appointed as a lecturer in anatomy and later lecturer in surgery at Ceylon Medical College, passing the Fellowship of the Royal Colleges of Surgeons in 1929. From 1930 to 1945 he served as a member of the Ceylon Medical Corps, acting as surgeon to the Military Hospital in Ceylon.

He served on the staff of the General Hospital, Colombo, from 1936 to 1960 and in 1951 he was elected the President of the Ceylon Medical Association.

Peiris was appointed an Officer of the Order of the British Empire in the 1952 Birthday Honours list.

Peiris was appointed to the Senate of Ceylon in 1955, as the representative of the Medical Association.

In March 1960 Peiris was appointed as by Prime Minister Dudley Senanayake as the Minister of Health and Social Sciences, as part of the Second Dudley Senanayake cabinet.

In March 1965 he was appointed as Minister of Commerce and Trade in the Third Dudley Senanayake cabinet In the 1968 cabinet re-shuffle Hugh Fernando was appointed the Minister of Commerce and Trade and Peiris was offered and accepted the position of Ceylon's Ambassador to the Soviet Union from 1968 and 1969. He was thereafter appointed the High Commissioner to United Kingdom from October 1969 to December 1970.

See also 
Sri Lankan Non Career Diplomats

References

1898 births
1988 deaths
Academic staff of Ceylon Medical College
Alumni of Ceylon Medical College
Alumni of St. John's College, Panadura
Alumni of Saint Joseph's College, Colombo
Ambassadors of Sri Lanka to the Soviet Union
Ceylonese Officers of the Order of the British Empire
Health ministers of Sri Lanka
High Commissioners of Sri Lanka to the United Kingdom
Members of the Senate of Ceylon
Sinhalese academics
Sinhalese physicians
Sinhalese politicians
Social affairs ministers of Sri Lanka
Sri Lankan surgeons
Trade ministers of Sri Lanka
20th-century surgeons